Robert Machan (born 18 October 1948) is a former professional tennis player from Hungary. He enjoyed most of his tennis success while playing doubles. During his career, he finished runner-up in three doubles events.

Machan participated in 21 Davis Cup ties for Hungary from 1969 to 1985, posting a 9–6 record in doubles and a 5–10 record in singles.

Career finals

Doubles (3 runner-ups)

External links
 
 
 

Hungarian male tennis players
1948 births
Living people
Tennis players from Budapest
20th-century Hungarian people
21st-century Hungarian people